Somra (after its literary dialect), also known as Burmese Tangkhul (Tangkhul Naga), is a Sino-Tibetan language spoken in Myanmar. The two ethnic Tangkhul languages are related, but are not mutually intelligible, being only 30% lexically similar. Somra is closer to Akyaung Ari.

Somra is spoken in Somra tract, Leshi Township and Homalin Township of Sagaing Division, Myanmar.

References

Languages of Myanmar
Tangkhulic languages